Admiral Sir John Forster "Sandy" Woodward,  (1 May 1932 – 4 August 2013) was a senior Royal Navy officer who commanded the Task Force of the Falklands War.

Early life
Woodward was born on 1 May 1932 at Penzance, Cornwall, to a bank clerk. He was educated at Stubbington House School, preparatory school in Stubbington, Hampshire. He then continued his education at the Britannia Royal Naval College in Dartmouth, Devon.

Naval career
On graduation from the Royal Naval College Dartmouth Woodward joined the Royal Navy in 1946. He became a submariner in 1954, and was promoted to lieutenant that May. In 1960 he passed the Royal Navy's rigorous Submarine Command Course known as The Perisher, and received his first command, the T-class submarine HMS Tireless. Promoted to lieutenant-commander in May 1962, he then commanded HMS Grampus before becoming the second in command of the nuclear fleet submarine HMS Valiant. In 1967, he was promoted to commander and became the Instructor (known as  Teacher) of The Perisher Course. He took command of HMS Warspite in December 1969. He was promoted to the rank of captain in 1972. In 1974, he became Captain of Submarine Training and in 1976 he took command of HMS Sheffield.

He became Head of Naval Plans in the Ministry of Defence in 1978. In July 1981, he was promoted to rear admiral and appointed as Flag Officer First Flotilla.

Falklands War
In 1982, he commanded the HMS Hermes aircraft carrier group, Task Group 317.8, in the Falklands War. The Commander-in-Chief Fleet Admiral Sir John Fieldhouse, served as the Task Force commander, CTF-317. The task group containing the amphibious ships which launched the invasion TG 317.0 was commanded by Commodore Michael Clapp, with Task Group 317.1 being the landing force itself.

He worked out the timetable for the campaign, starting from the end and working to the start. Knowing that the Argentine forces had to be defeated before the Southern Hemisphere winter made conditions too bad, he set a latest date by which the land forces had to be ashore, that in turn set a latest date by which control of the air had to be achieved, and so on.

Possibly the best known single incident was the sinking of the ARA General Belgrano. He knew that General Belgrano, and particularly her Exocet armed escorts, were a threat to the task force and he ordered that she be sunk. Admiral Sir George Zambellas credited "Woodward's inspirational leadership and tactical acumen ... [as] a major factor in shaping the success of the British forces in the South Atlantic".

Woodward was knighted for his services in the conflict. He wrote a book entitled One Hundred Days, co-authored by Patrick Robinson, describing his Falklands experiences.

Later career
In 1983, Woodward was appointed Flag Officer Submarines and NATO Commander Submarines Eastern Atlantic. In 1984, he was promoted to vice admiral, and in 1985 he was Deputy Chief of the Defence Staff (Commitments).In 1987, he was Promoted to Admiral.That year he also served, as Commander-in-Chief Naval Home Command and Flag Aide-de-Camp to the Queen. Woodward retired in 1989.

Later life

The first edition of Woodward's memoirs was published in 1992. They were well received and were updated in 2003 and 2012 with updated recollections as well as responses to the memoirs and responses made by Commodore Michael Clapp. In his later life Woodward wrote various opinion pieces for British newspapers regarding defence matters, particularly the Strategic Defence and Security Review.

Death
He died of heart failure in his 82nd year on 4 August 2013 at Bosham, West Sussex. A memorial service was held for him at Chichester Cathedral on 14 November 2013, with Admiral Sir George Zambellas representing the Queen.

Personal life
Woodward married Charlotte McMurtrie in 1960, the marriage producing a son and a daughter. Lady Woodward died in 2022.

Honours and decorations

On 11 October 1982, Woodward was appointed Knight Commander of the Order of the Bath (KCB) 'in recognition of service within the operations in the South Atlantic'. In the 1989 Queen's Birthday Honours, he was appointed Knight Grand Cross of the Order of the British Empire (GBE).

Publications

Footnotes

|-

|-

1932 births
2013 deaths
Royal Navy admirals
Royal Navy submarine commanders
Military personnel from Cornwall
Knights Grand Cross of the Order of the British Empire
Knights Commander of the Order of the Bath
Royal Navy personnel of the Falklands War
Segrave Trophy recipients
People educated at Stubbington House School
Graduates of Britannia Royal Naval College
People from Penzance
People from Bosham